Tall Khani-ye Kakan (also Romanized as Tall Khānī-ye Kākān; also known as Tall Khālī and Tall Khānī) is a village in Kakan Rural District, in the Central District of Boyer-Ahmad County, Kohgiluyeh and Boyer-Ahmad Province, Iran. At the 2006 census, its population was 15, in 4 families.

References 

Populated places in Boyer-Ahmad County